
This is a list of the 49 players who earned 1997 PGA Tour cards through the PGA Tour Qualifying Tournament in 1996.

 PGA Tour rookie in 1997

1997 Results

*PGA Tour rookie in 1997
T = Tied
 The player retained his PGA Tour card for 1998 (finished inside the top 125)
 The player did not retain his PGA Tour card for 1998, but retained conditional status (finished between 126-150)
 The player did not retain his PGA Tour card for 1998 (finished outside the top 150)

Winners on the PGA Tour in 1997

Runners-up on the PGA Tour in 1997

See also
1996 Nike Tour graduates

References

PGA Tour Qualifying School
PGA Tour Qualifying School Graduates
PGA Tour Qualifying School Graduates